= MicroRNA 517c =

Non-coding RNA in the species Homo sapiens

MIR517C

Identifiers
- Aliases: MIR517C, MIRN517C, microRNA 517c
- External IDs: GeneCards: MIR517C; OMA:MIR517C - orthologs

Gene location (Human)
Chr.	Chromosome 19 (human)
Band	19q13.42	Start	53,741,313 bp
Band	19q13.42	End	53,741,407 bp
RNA expression pattern
Bgee	Human / Mouse (ortholog); Top expressed in: blood; monocyte; Achilles tendon; lung; ascending aorta; transverse colon; mucosa of esophagus; body of stomach; subcutaneous adipose tissue; canal of the cervix / n/a; More reference expression data
BioGPS	n/a
Orthologs
Species	Human	Mouse
Entrez	574492	n/a
Ensembl	ENSG00000207838	n/a
UniProt	n a	n/a
RefSeq (mRNA)	n/a	n/a
RefSeq (protein)	n/a	n/a
Location (UCSC)	Chr 19: 53.74 – 53.74 Mb	n/a
PubMed search		n/a
- Wikidata
View/Edit Human

MicroRNA 517c is a microRNA that in humans is encoded by the MIR517C gene.

== Function ==
microRNAs (miRNAs) are short (20-24 nt) non-coding RNAs that are involved in post-transcriptional regulation of gene expression in multicellular organisms by affecting both the stability and translation of mRNAs. miRNAs are transcribed by RNA polymerase II as part of capped and polyadenylated primary transcripts (pri-miRNAs) that can be either protein-coding or non-coding. The primary transcript is cleaved by the Drosha ribonuclease III enzyme to produce an approximately 70-nt stem-loop precursor miRNA (pre-miRNA), which is further cleaved by the cytoplasmic Dicer ribonuclease to generate the mature miRNA and antisense miRNA star (miRNA*) products. The mature miRNA is incorporated into a RNA-induced silencing complex (RISC), which recognizes target mRNAs through imperfect base pairing with the miRNA and most commonly results in translational inhibition or destabilization of the target mRNA. The RefSeq represents the predicted microRNA stem-loop. [provided by RefSeq, Sep 2009].
